Terje Paul Wibe (born 6 October 1947) is a Norwegian chess player. In  chess, he received the FIDE title of International Master (IM) in 1977. In correspondence chess, he earned the ICCF title of Grandmaster (GM) in 1993.

Biography
In the 1970s, Wibe was one of the leading Norwegian chess players. He won Norwegian Chess Championship in 1971.

He played for Norway in the Chess Olympiads:
 In 1966, at second reserve board in the 17th Chess Olympiad in Havana (+3, =3, -4),
 In 1968, at first reserve board in the 18th Chess Olympiad in Lugano (+8, =1, -5),
 In 1970, at fourth board in the 19th Chess Olympiad in Siegen (+4, =9, -2),
 In 1972, at second board in the 20th Chess Olympiad in Skopje (+6, =2, -6),
 In 1978, at first board in the 23rd Chess Olympiad in Buenos Aires (+0, =5, -6).

Wibe played for Norway in the World Student Team Chess Championships:
 In 1968, at fourth board in the 15th World Student Team Chess Championship in Ybbs (+5, =2, -4),
 In 1969, at fourth board in the 16th World Student Team Chess Championship in Dresden (+6, =4, -1).

He played for Norway in the Nordic Chess Cups:
 In 1970, at fifth board in the 1st Nordic Chess Cup in Großenbrode (+1, =1, -1) and won team bronze medal,
 In 1972, at first board in the 3rd Nordic Chess Cup in Großenbrode (+1, =1, -2),
 In 1973, at third board in the 4th Nordic Chess Cup in Ribe (+1, =1, -3) and won team bronze medal,
 In 1975, at third board in the 6th Nordic Chess Cup in Hindås (+4, =1, -0) and won individual gold medal,
 In 1977, at third board in the 8th Nordic Chess Cup in Glücksburg (+2, =1, -2),
 In 1983, at fourth board in the 9th Nordic Chess Cup in Oslo (+2, =2, -3),
 In 1987, at second board in the 11th Nordic Chess Cup in Słupsk (+0, =2, -2) and won team gold medal.

From 1977, Wibe actively participated in correspondence chess tournaments. He is a five-time winner of the Norwegian Correspondence Chess Championships: 1978, 1980, 1981, 1983, and 1990.

References

External links
 
 
 
 

1947 births
Living people
Norwegian chess players
Chess International Masters
Correspondence chess grandmasters
Chess Olympiad competitors